The 19th Guldbagge Awards ceremony, presented by the Swedish Film Institute, honored the best Swedish films of 1982 and 1983, and took place on 31 October 1983. Fanny and Alexander directed by Ingmar Bergman was presented with the award for Best Film.

Awards
 Best Film: Fanny and Alexander by Ingmar Bergman
 Best Director: Ingmar Bergman for Fanny and Alexander
 Best Actor: Jarl Kulle for Fanny and Alexander
 Best Actress: 
 Malin Ek for Mamma
 Kim Anderzon for Second Dance
 The Ingmar Bergman Award: Gunnar Björnstrand

References

External links
Official website
Guldbaggen on Facebook
Guldbaggen on Twitter
19th Guldbagge Awards at Internet Movie Database

1983 in Sweden
1983 film awards
Guldbagge Awards ceremonies
October 1983 events in Europe
1980s in Stockholm